Hamlett is a surname. Notable people with the surname include:

Anthony Hamlett (born 1971), American mixed martial artist
Barksdale Hamlett (1908–1979), United States Army general
Bradley Maxon Hamlett, American politician
Connor Hamlett (born 1992), American football player
Denis Hamlett (born 1969), Costa Rican footballer and manager
Dilys Hamlett (1928–2002), English actress
Lol Hamlett (1917–1986), English footballer and manager

See also
Hamlet (disambiguation)